Happy Woman Blues is the second studio album by American singer-songwriter Lucinda Williams, released in 1980, by Smithsonian Folkways. 

While her debut album, Ramblin' on My Mind (1979), consisted entirely of cover recordings, all of Happy Woman Blues was written solely by Williams. She also produced the album, alongside Mickey White. Supported by a six-member band, the songs are a mix of traditional and alternative country, folk, and blues that reflect her Louisiana roots.

Critical reception 

Happy Woman Blues was met with critical acclaim. Robert Christgau, writing for The Village Voice, graded the album A–, and called Williams a "guileless throwback to the days of the acoustic blues mamas" who "means what she says and says what she means". Trouser Press felt the record was more "rock-oriented" than Williams' debut album, writing that she used timeworn ideas such as "smoke-stained bars, open roads and a heart that never learns" but reimagined them "in a way that is both contemporary and uncynical".

In a retrospective review for AllMusic, Kurt Wolff gave it four out of five stars and said "King of Hearts", "Sharp Cutting Wings", and "Lafayette" are well composed, emotionally powerful classics on an album that was bold, refreshing, and "stunning for its mixture of blues, folk, and country traditions with [Williams'] captivating, complex, and visceral approach to writing and singing".

Track listing
All tracks written by Lucinda Williams.

Side one
"Lafayette" – 3:40
"I Lost It" – 2:52
"Maria" – 3:45
"Happy Woman Blues" – 3:08
"King of Hearts" – 4:02

Side two
"Rolling Along" – 2:46
"One Night Stand" – 2:53
"Howlin' at Midnight" – 3:49
"Hard Road" – 2:29
"Louisiana Man" – 2:23
"Sharp Cutting Wings (Song to a Poet)" – 3:26

Personnel
 Lucinda Williams – lead vocals, acoustic guitars
 Mickey White – acoustic rhythm and lead guitars, harmony vocals
 Rex Bell – electric bass, harmony vocals
 Andre Mathews – electric rhythm, lead and slide guitars
 Ira Wilkes – drums
 "Uncle" Mickey Moody – pedal steel guitar
 Malcolm Smith – fiddle, viola
Technical
"Uncle" Mickey Moody - engineer
Ronald Clyne - cover design

References

External links 
 
Lucinda Williams Official Website

Lucinda Williams albums
1980 albums
Smithsonian Folkways albums